The following ships of the Indian Navy have been named Investigator:

 was a survey ship of the Royal Indian Navy, launched in 1925 as the mercantile Patrick Stewart she was acquired by the Indian navy in 1934 and on conversion to a survey ship renamed Investigator. She was sold in 1951.
Subsequently became INS Khukri and on conversion into a surveying ship in 1951 renamed Investigator. She was scrapped in 1975
 is a  launched in 1987

Indian Navy ship names